Mont Péko National Park is a national park in Côte d'Ivoire.

Mont Péko, elevation 833 meters (2723 feet), is located in the northern portion of the park.

It has existed since 1968.

There are two mountains in Mont Peco National Park. The highest and most prominent mountain is Mont Péko with the highest peak of 997 meters.

Forest covers 80% of the park and usually includes tree species such as Triplochiton scleroxylon, Celtis spp., Pterygota macrocarpa, and Mansonia altissima. About 240 species of birds have been recorded in the park.

Status of Great Apes
A recent census carried out by Herbinger and Lia (unpublished reports 2001) found a significant population of chimpanzees in this park. The census was carried out in April 2001 using four different straight transect lines between 2–4 km long and totalling 12.5 km in length. The census suggested a density of 1.6 chimpanzees per km2 and a total population of around 320 weaned chimpanzees for Mont Péko National Park. The classified forest of Haut Sassandra, which is connected through corridors to Mont Péko might still hold up to 400 chimpanzees (Hoppe-Dominik 1991).

References

Herbinger, I. and Lia, D. (2001)Rapport de recensement de la population de chimpanzees au Mont Peko. Unpublished report.
Hoppe-Dominik, B. 1991. Distribution and status of chimpanzees (Pan troglodytes verus) on the Ivory Coast. Primate Report, 31, 45–57.

Peko
Guinean montane forests
National parks of Ivory Coast
Montagnes District